Nevrina is a genus of moths of the family Crambidae.

Species
Nevrina procopia (Stoll in Cramer & Stoll, 1781)
Nevrina radiata Ghesquière, 1942
Nevrina verlainei Ghesquière, 1942

References

Natural History Museum Lepidoptera genus database

Pyraustinae
Crambidae genera
Taxa named by Achille Guenée